''See Battle of Chlumec for the 1126 battle at Kulm

The Battle of Kulm was fought near the town Kulm and the village Přestanov in northern Bohemia. It was fought on 29–30 August 1813, during the War of the Sixth Coalition. A French corps under General Dominique Vandamme attacked Alexander Ostermann-Tolstoy's Russian corps on 29 August. The next day, Friedrich von Kleist's Prussian corps hit Vandamme in the rear while Russian and Austrian reinforcements attacked the French front and left. Vandamme was defeated with the loss of between 13,000 and 25,000 men and 82 guns.

Background 
Following the French victory at Dresden, Vandamme pursued the retreating allies. Napoleon sent Marshals Gouvion Saint Cyr and Auguste Marmont to support Vandamme's corps. With Vandamme in advance, Saint Cyr's and Marmont's corps brought up the rear. Vandamme caught up with Alexander Ivanovich Ostermann-Tolstoy's forces near the town of Kulm, eight kilometres northwest of Aussig (Ústí nad Labem, now in the Czech Republic).

Battle

On 29 August, Vandamme, with 34,000 soldiers and 84 guns at his disposal, attacked Russian formations forming a rearguard for the retreating Coalition army, at 14,700 strong, under the command of Russian general Ostermann-Tolstoy. The situation was very dangerous for the allies; if Vandamme won the battle, the French would take the passes in the mountains, and the retreating Coalition army could be trapped by Napoleon. However, Ostermann-Tolstoy rallied all of his troops for a stiff defense, and soon Vandamme's troops were repulsed. Vandamme's situation changed the next day. A Prussian army corps commanded by Friedrich von Kleist attacked Vandamme's rear guard. Kleist then received help from a combined Russian and Austrian attack on his front, under the command of Generals Ostermann-Tolstoy and von Colloredo-Mansfeld. In an attempt to repulse simultaneous attacks on his front and rear, Vandamme ordered his forces to form squares. The inexperienced French troops were unable to fend off the allies, and soon withdrew from the battlefield, with heavy losses, including Vandamme himself as a captured prisoner of war.

Casualties
The French lost 25,000 of the pursuing force of 34,000, including Vandamme, and almost all of his artillery, 82 of his 84 guns, were captured. The allies lost approximately 11,000 soldiers killed or wounded.

In Vandamme's corps there were two Polish regiments of Uhlans, part of cavalry divisions under the command of General Jean Corbineau. These regiments were used by Vandamme to defend against enemy cavalry charges. One regiment, commanded by Colonel Maximilian Fredro (brother of playwright Alexander Fredro), was attacked after withdrawing to a defile and surrendered. The other regiment of Uhlans, under the command of Count Tomasz Łubieński (generally known in English as Thomas Lubienski) successfully withdrew.

Aftermath
While Marshal MacDonald's defeat at Katzbach coincided with Napoleon's victory at Dresden, the Coalition success at Kulm eventually negated his triumph, given that his troops never completely crushed the enemy. Thus, by winning this battle, Ostermann-Tolstoy and his troops succeeded in buying much needed time for the Coalition armies to regroup after the Battle of Dresden for the Battle of Wartenburg and subsequently for the Battle of Leipzig.

Insults
According to a French anecdote, after the battle Vandamme was brought to and accused by Emperor Alexander I of Russia of being a brigand and plunderer. He retorted, "I am neither a plunderer nor a brigand, but in any case, my contemporaries and history will not reproach me for having murdered my own father." This statement apparently hinted at the widespread belief that Alexander I was implicated in the murder of his father, Emperor Paul I.

The battlefield today
The battlefield is mostly built over.  There is a large monument topped with a lion next door to the Hotel Napoleon.

Notes

References

Sources

Further reading

External links
Battle of Kulm
Memoirs of the Duke Rovigo

Battles of the War of the Sixth Coalition
Battles of the Napoleonic Wars
Battles involving Austria
Battles involving France
Battles involving Prussia
Battles involving Russia
Conflicts in 1813
August 1813 events
19th century in Bohemia
1813 in the Austrian Empire
1813 in France